The Return of Sherlock Holmes is a 1929 American Pre-Code mystery film directed by Basil Dean and written by Arthur Conan Doyle, Basil Dean and Garrett Fort. The film shares its title with the third volume of the Sherlock Holmes stories, The Return of Sherlock Holmes by Arthur Conan Doyle. The film stars Clive Brook, H. Reeves-Smith, Betty Lawford, Charles Hay and Phillips Holmes. The film was released October 29, 1929, by Paramount Pictures. A copy is held at the Library of Congress.

Plot

Cast
Clive Brook as Sherlock Holmes 
H. Reeves-Smith as Dr. Watson
Betty Lawford as Mary Watson 
Charles Hay as Captain Longmore 
Phillips Holmes as Roger Longmore 
Donald Crisp as Colonel Moran 
Harry T. Morey as Professor Moriarty
Hubert Druce as  Sergeant Gripper

Production
Shot at the Astoria Studios in New York, The Return of Sherlock Holmes was the first sound film to feature Sherlock Holmes. A silent version of the film was also produced to accommodate theaters which did not feature sound.

References

External links

1929 films
American detective films
Films directed by Basil Dean
Sherlock Holmes films based on works by Arthur Conan Doyle
1929 mystery films
American mystery films
Paramount Pictures films
American black-and-white films
Films set in London
Films shot at Astoria Studios
1920s English-language films
Films with screenplays by Garrett Fort
1920s American films